McAnearney is a surname. Notable people with the surname include:

 Jim McAnearney (born 1935), Scottish football player and manager
 Tom McAnearney (born 1933), Scottish football player

See also
 McInerney